The St. Lawrence Saints Men's Ice Hockey team, colloquially known as the "Skating Saints", is a National Collegiate Athletic Association (NCAA) Division I college ice hockey program that represents St. Lawrence University. The Saints are a member of the ECAC Hockey. They have played at Appleton Arena in Canton, New York, since 1951. Prior to the arena's construction, the men's team played outdoors at the current location of Whitman Hall.

History
Since the team's inception in 1925, the Saints men's hockey program has been a competitive team at the top ranks of American college hockey. Due to World War II, there were no teams during the 1941–42 season, or the 1943–44 through 1945–46 seasons.

The team plays in the ECAC Hockey League, one of six Division I leagues. This league currently boasts six Ivy League teams, including perennial powers Cornell and Harvard as well as six colleges from upstate New York and Connecticut. Since the inception of the ECAC in 1961, SLU has won six ECAC tournament titles and two ECAC regular season titles.

Since the 1951–52 season, SLU has made sixteen NCAA tournament appearances. St. Lawrence has been to the Frozen Four and its antecedent the four team NCAA Championships a total of nine times, playing in the title games in 1961 and 1988. St. Lawrence has accomplished this despite being, at approximately 2,000 students, one of the smallest colleges to play at the Division I level. A Division III school in all other sports, St. Lawrence has maintained Division I "play-up" status in hockey thanks to a 2004 NCAA resolution, allowing it (along with 11 other schools) to offer Division I scholarships in only one sport.  St. Lawrence did not offer grant-in-aid hockey scholarships until the mid-1990s.

In 1988, the Saints played in the NCAA national championship game at the Olympic Arena in Lake Placid, NY, losing to Lake Superior State University 4–3 in overtime. The 1987–88 season was the most successful in team history, with an overall record of 29–9–0. In 2000, the Saints played in the longest NCAA tournament game on record; a 3–2, quadruple overtime victory over Boston University. The win advanced the Saints to the Frozen Four, where the team eventually lost to Boston College in the National Semifinals. The Men's program has produced 28 All-American players, seven ECAC tournament MVPs, six ECAC players of the year, four ECAC rookies of the year, and nine Hobey Baker Memorial Award finalists.

From 1985 until 2012, Joe Marsh was the head coach at St. Lawrence. In 2007, he won his 400th Division I game (all at St. Lawrence) placing him in 6th place among active NCAA Division I coaches in career wins. Marsh is a two-time winner of the Spencer Penrose Award given to the best college coach of the year.

Following Marsh's retirement in 2012, former Ottawa Senators assistant coach, and Saints alumnus, Greg Carvel took over head coaching duties. In 2016, Carvel departed the program to take the same role at the University of Massachusetts-Amherst. Following the departure of Carvel, St. Lawrence named former Clarkson University head coach Mark Morris as the 14th head coach in program history.

Beginning with the 2019–20 season, the Saints announced Brent Brekke as the 15th head coach in program history.

St. Lawrence's biggest hockey rival is Clarkson University, located in Potsdam, ten miles from the St. Lawrence campus. For many years, the swing through the North Country has been considered to be one of the most grueling road trips in college hockey.

St. Lawrence plays its home hockey games at Appleton Arena, a classic old time hockey barn which has seen many upgrades since opening in 1950 with a 4–2 St. Lawrence win over Dartmouth College.

Season-by-season results

Source:

Records vs. current ECAC Hockey teams
As of the completion of the 2018–19 season

Coaches

As of completion of the 2021–22 season

† Leon Abbott resigned in December 1979 and Dale Henwood served as the interim coach for the remainder of the season.

Uniforms 
Traditionally, the Saints home jersey is white with scarlet shoulders and brown trim. The end of the sleeves and bottom of the sweater feature scarlet and brown stripes. The school's crest and the player's name and number all appear in scarlet with brown trim. The road jersey are identically designed, but with the white and scarlet portions reversed. In 2002, a lace-up neck was adopted by the men's team.

In 2001, in honor of Appleton Arena's 50th anniversary, an alternate "throw-back" jersey was introduced for the men's team. The alternate jersey is white but does not feature colored shoulders. The StL logo is significantly smaller, and "St. Lawrence" is spelled out across the chest. The school seal also appears on both shoulders of the sweater. This jersey continued to be used occasionally until gaining popularity during the 2006–07 season, when the men's team exhibited frequent success when wearing the alternate jerseys on home ice. As a result, the alternate jersey quickly became the staple home jersey.  Beginning with the 2012–13 season, St. Lawrence retired the StL logo from the red road jerseys as well, and adopted a design that matched the home white sweaters.

Originally, the women's program wore jerseys that were identical to the men's jerseys. However, in fall 2005, the women's jerseys were designed to be unique from the men's jerseys. The scarlet and brown on the shoulders of the home jersey was extended down the arms until it met with the trim at the end of the sleeve. The player's number appears within the scarlet portion and is white with brown trim. The road jerseys feature a similar pattern, but the shoulders and sleeves are brown with white trim (a reverse of the traditional road-jersey scheme) on a red background.

In tribute to Mike Pelletier and Rich Stewart, teammates on the 1988 NCAA finalist team who were among the victims of the September 11, 2001, terrorist attacks, the 2001–02 men's team wore a patch on the shoulder of their jerseys with both players' initials. Pelletier and Stewart had both been employees of Cantor Fitzgerald working in the World Trade Center.

In the 2008–09 season, St. Lawrence, along with all other ECAC Hockey teams, participated in Coaches vs. Cancer's "Pink at the Rink" fundraiser. The Men's team wore black sweaters with pink and white trim while the Women's team wore pink uniforms with white trim. The jerseys, along with pink ties worn by the coaches and pink sticks were then auctioned off to raise funds for breast cancer research. (The Men's team only wore the pink jerseys during warmups, as visiting team Harvard had forgotten to bring their home white jerseys.)

Traditions 

 Whenever a goal is scored, the crowd will sing "When the Saints Go Marching In" immediately after the goal is announced. A skating saint sign at each end of the arena flashes as well.
 When the final minute of the period is announced, fans respond by yelling "And Clarkson Still Sucks!" referring to St Lawrence's nearby rival school. This same cheer is often used by fans at Rensselaer, whose rivalry with Clarkson stems from being another engineering school in the ECAC Hockey, and not from geographic location.
 Due to St Lawrence's proximity to Canada, both the American and Canadian national anthems are played prior to home games. Many fans will shout the word "saints" over the final word of the American national anthem. This is a shared tradition among schools in the ECAC Hockey; notably Clarkson fans and Cornell fans will shout "knights" and "red," respectively, when those words appear in the anthem's lyrics.
 Since the fall of 1999, students have brought a school flag into the stands to wave when team takes the ice and when they score. Cowbells have also become popular among fans (possibly due to the large population of dairy farmers in the region), and are sold at the school's bookstore, with the St. Lawrence University crest printed on them.

Statistical Leaders
Source:

Career points leaders

Career goaltending leaders

GP = Games played; Min = Minutes played; W = Wins; L = Losses; T = Ties; GA = Goals against; SO = Shutouts; SV% = Save percentage; GAA = Goals against average

Minimum 30 games played

Statistics current through the start of the 2019–20 season.

Roster
As of September 19, 2022.

Awards and honors

Hockey Hall of Fame
Source:

Bill Torrey (1995)
Brian McFarlane (1995)

United States Hockey Hall of Fame
Source:

Ron Mason (2013)

NCAA

Individual awards

Hobey Baker Award Finalists

 Peter Lappin: 1988
 Daniel Laperrière: 1992
 Burke Murphy: 1996
 Eric Heffler: 1999
 Erik Anderson: 2001

 T. J. Trevelyan: 2006
 Drew Bagnall: 2007
 Kyle Flanagan: 2013
 Greg Carey: 2013, 2014

Spencer Penrose Award
 Joe Marsh: 1989, 2000

All-Americans
AHCA First Team All-Americans

1954–55: Bill Sloan, G
1956–57: Pat Presley, D
1958–59: Pat Presley, D
1959–60: Terry Slater, F
1960–61: Arlie Parker, D; Terry Slater, F
1961–62: Arlie Parker, D
1962–63: Richie Broadbelt, G
1963–64: Bob Perani, G
1982–83: Gray Weicker, G
1987–88: Brian McColgan, D; Pete Lappin, F
1988–89: Mike Hurlbut, D
1990–91: Les Kuntar, G
1991–92: Daniel Laperrière, D
1998–99: Eric Heffler, G
1999–00: Justin Harney, D
2000–01: Erik Anderson, F
2005–06: T. J. Trevelyan, F
2006–07: Drew Bagnall, D
2008–09: Zach Miskovic, D
2012–13: Kyle Flanagan, F
2013–14: Greg Carey, F

AHCA Second Team All-Americans

1953–54: Bill Sloan, G
1955–56: Bill Sloan, G; Chuck Lundberg, D; Ed Zifcak, F
1956–57: Joe McLean, F
1986–87: Scott Yearwood, G; Pete Lappin, F
1991–92: Mike Lappin, F
1995–96: Burke Murphy, F
1999–00: Brandon Dietrich, F
2000–01: Matt Desrosiers, D
2012–13: George Hughes, D; Greg Carey, F
2015–16: Gavin Bayreuther, D
2016–17: Kyle Hayton, G; Gavin Bayreuther, D

ECAC Hockey

Individual awards

Player of the Year
 Pete Lappin: 1988
 Daniel Laperrière: 1992
 Eric Heffler: 1999
 Erik Anderson: 2001
 T. J. Trevelyan: 2006
 Drew Bagnall: 2007
 Greg Carey: 2014

Best Defensive Forward
 Greg Carvel: 1993
 Joel Prpic: 1997
 Mike Gellard: 2001
 Kyle Rank: 2007
 Travis Vermeulen: 2010

Best Defensive Defenseman
 Arlie Parker: 1962
 Jeff Kungle: 1996
 Justin Harney: 2000
 Mike Madill: 2006
 Drew Bagnall: 2007
 Matt Generous: 2009

Rookie of the Year
 Burke Murphy: 1993
 Paul DiFrancesco: 1995
 Brandon Dietrich: 1999
 Derek Gustafson: 2000
 Gavin Bayreuther: 2014
 Kyle Hayton: 2015

Ken Dryden Award
 Eric Heffler: 1999
 Kyle Hayton: 2017

Ken Dryden Award
 Joe Marsh: 1989, 1996, 1999, 2007
 Greg Carvel: 2015

Most Outstanding Player in Tournament
 Arlie Parker: 1962
 Bob Perani: 1964
 Pete Lappin: 1988
 Doug Murray: 1989
 Daniel Laperrière: 1992
 Derek Gustafson: 2000
 Jeremy Symington: 2001
 David Jankowski: 2021

All-Conference
First Team All-ECAC Hockey

 1961–62: Arlie Parker, D; Ron Mason, F
 1962–63: Richie Broadbelt, G; Ron Mason, F
 1963–64: Bob Perani, G; Jim Salfi, D
 1967–68: Gary Croteau, F
 1987–88: Brian McColgan, D; Pete Lappin, F
 1988–89: Mike Hurlbut, D
 1990–91: Les Kuntar, G; Andy Pritchard, F
 1991–92: Daniel Laperrière, D; Mike Lappin, F
 1995–96: Burke Murphy, F
 1998–99: Eric Heffler, G
 1999–00: Brandon Dietrich, F
 2000–01: Matt Desrosiers, D; Erik Anderson, F; Mike Gellard, F
 2003–04: Ryan Glenn, D
 2004–05: T. J. Trevelyan, F
 2005–06: Mike Madill, D; T. J. Trevelyan, F
 2006–07: Drew Bagnall, D; Kyle Rank, F
 2008–09: Zach Miskovic, D
 2012–13: George Hughes, D; Greg Carey, F; Kyle Flanagan, F
 2013–14: Greg Carey, F
 2015–16: Gavin Bayreuther, D
 2016–17: Kyle Hayton, G; Gavin Bayreuther, D
 2020–21: Cameron Buhl, F

Second Team All-ECAC Hockey

 1961–62: Richie Broadbelt, G; Rollie Anderson, F
 1963–64: Arnie O'Reilly, F; Dave Ross, F
 1982–83: Gray Weicker, D; Kent Carlson, D
 1984–85: Steve Tuite, D
 1986–87: Scott Yearwood, G; Hank Lammens, D; Pete Lappin, F
 1987–88: Hank Lammens, D
 1988–89: Mike Bishop, D
 1989–90: Joe Day, F
 1990–91: Daniel Laperrière, D
 1992–93: Ted Beattie, D
 1994–95: Burke Murphy, F
 1995–96: Jeff Kungle, D
 1996–97: Paul DiFrancesco, F
 1997–98: Paul DiFrancesco, F
 1998–99: Bob Prier, F
 1999–00: Derek Gustafson, G; Justin Harney, D; Erik Anderson, F
 2006–07: Alex Petizian, G
 2013–14: Gavin Bayreuther, D
 2014–15: Kyle Hayton, G; Eric Sweetman, D
 2015–16: Eric Sweetman, D

Third Team All-ECAC Hockey

 2008–09: Brock McBride, F
 2009–10: Derek Keller, D; Travis Vermeulen, F
 2011–12: Kyle Flanagan, F

ECAC Hockey All-Rookie Team

 1988–89: Shawn Rivers, D
 1989–90: Greg Carvel, F
 1990–91: Mike McCourt, D; Eric Lacroix, F
 1992–93: Jeff Kungle, D; Burke Murphy, F
 1993–94: Troy Creurer, D
 1994–95: Paul DiFrancesco, F
 1995–96: John Poapst, D
 1998–99: Ray DiLauro, D; Brandon Dietrich, F
 1999–00: Derek Gustafson, G
 2002–03: John Zeiler, F
 2003–04: Kyle Rank, F
 2005–06: Matt Generous, D
 2006–07: Alex Petizian, G
 2009–10: George Hughes, D
 2010–11: Greg Carey, F
 2011–12: Chris Martin, F
 2013–14: Gavin Bayreuther, D; Matt Carey, F
 2014–15: Kyle Hayton, G; Nolan Gluchowski, D
 2020–21: Luc Salem, D; Greg Lapointe, F

Olympians
This is a list of St. Lawrence alumni who have played on an Olympic team.

Hank Lammens also participated in the 1992 Summer Olympics in sailing.

St. Lawrence Saints Hall of Fame
The following is a list of people associated with the St. Lawrence men's ice hockey program who were elected into the St. Lawrence University Athletic Hall of Fame.

Erik Anderson (2019)
Oliver Appleton (1982)
Richie Broadbelt (2000)
John M. Burger (2005)
Gary Croteau (1990)
Kevin Dougherty (1991)
Jack Klemens (1980)
Hank Lammens (2015)
Daniel Laperrière (2013)
Pete Lappin (2008)
Al MacCormack (2002)
Ron Mason (1999)
Brian McColgan (2015)
Brian McFarlane (1985)
Bernie McKinnon (2000)
Burke Murphy (2017)
Arlie Parker (1988)
Pat Presley (1987)
Jesse Sammis (1985)
Terry Slater (1986)
Bill Sloan (1986)
The Ottawa Connection (1993):Ron O'BrienJoe McLeanLee Fournier
Bill Torrey (1996)
Lawrence Traynor (1983)

Saints in the NHL
As of July 1, 2022.

Source:

See also
St. Lawrence Saints women's ice hockey

References 

 
Ice hockey teams in New York (state)